Arim (also Romanized as Ārīm) is a village in Rastupey Rural District, in the Central District of Savadkuh County, Mazandaran Province, Iran.  Arim located after Kangelo Village . At the 2006 census, its population was 111, in 36 families.

References 

Populated places in Savadkuh County